Heidemarie Wycisk (born 2 February 1949) is a German athlete. She competed in the women's long jump at the 1976 Summer Olympics.

References

External links
 

1949 births
Living people
Athletes (track and field) at the 1976 Summer Olympics
German female long jumpers
Olympic athletes of East Germany
Place of birth missing (living people)